Besme is an Adamawa language of Chad. It is one of the three members of the Kim languages group, together with Kim and Goundo.

References

Languages of Chad
Kim languages